The following is a list of released songs recorded and performed by Roxette.

The goal here is to capture all songs and their initial source.

Alternate versions are captured as indents following the main song (album) version.

Alternates and B-sides may include other publications beyond the initial source.

Live versions not included unless it was the only or initial source of the song.

0–9 
 "2 Cinnamon Street" (Super Mario Bros OST, 1993)
 "7Twenty7" (Have a Nice Day, 1999)
Demo (The Rox Box/Roxette 86-06, 2006) (Rox Box 15)
 "20 BPM" (Good Karma, 2016)

A 
 "A Thing About You" (The Ballad Hits, 2002) (A collection . . ) (XXX) (Rox Box 06) (Rox Box 15)
 "After All" (Charm School, 2011)
T&A demo 7/27/10 (Charm School revisited, 2011)
 "All I Ever Wanted" (The Rox Box/Roxette 86-06, 2006)
 "Almost Unreal" (A-Side from "Almost Unreal"/Super Mario Bros OST, 1993) (Don’t bore us …) (Ballad hits) (A collection . . ) (XXX) (Rox Box 06) (Rox Box 15)
Demo Feb 1993 (Roxette Rarities, 1995)
 "Always Breaking My Heart" (The Rox Box/Roxette 86-06, 2006) (Rox Box 15)
”Always the Last to Know” (Bag of Trix, 2020)
 "Angel Passing" (Travelling, 2012)
 ”Another Place Another Time” (Joyride 30th, 2021)
 "Anyone" (Have a Nice Day, 1999)
 "Anyone/I Love How You Love Me" (The Rox Box/Roxette 86-06, 2006) (Rox Box 15)
 "April Clouds" (Good Karma, 2016) (Rewrite of "Wish You the Best" on the Gessle album The World According to Gessle)

B 
 “Beautiful Boy” (Bag of Trix, 2020)
"Beautiful Things" (Have a Nice Day, 1999)
”Before You Go To Sleep” demo (Bag of Trix, 2020)
 "Better Off on Her Own" (B-Side from "Stars",1999) (The Pop Hits, 2003)
 Demo (The Rox Box/Roxette 86-06, 2006)
 "Big Black Cadillac" (Charm School, 2011)
T&A demo 7/2/10 (Charm School revisited, 2011)
 "Bla Bla Bla Bla Bla (You Broke My Heart)" (The Pop Hits, 2003) (The Rox Box/Roxette 86-06, 2006) (Rox Box 15)
 "Breathe" (The Ballad Hits, 2002) (Rox Box 06) (Rox Box 15)
 "Bringing Me Down to My Knees" (Room Service, 2001)

C 
 "Call of the Wild" (Pearls of Passion, 1986)
 "Chances" (Look Sharp!, 1988)
 "Church of Your Heart" (Joyride, 1991)
 US ac-mix (Joyride 30th, 2021)
 T&A demo (Joyride 30th, 2021)
 "Cinnamon Street" (Tourism, 1992)
 "Come Back (Before You Leave)" (B-Side from "Joyride", 1991) (Joyride 30th)
 Version on Tourism
 "Cooper" (Have a Nice Day, 1999)
Cooper(Closer to God) (Bag of Trix, 2020)
 "Crash! Boom! Bang!" (Crash! Boom! Bang!, 1994)
Single edit (Don't Bore Us, Get to the Chorus - Roxette's Greatest Hits, 1995)(Ballad hits) (A collection . . ) (Rox Box 06) (Rox Box 15)
Radio edit (Roxette XXX The 30 Biggest Hits)
 "Crazy About You" (B-Side from "You Don't Understand Me",1995)
 "Crush on You" (Have a Nice Day, 1999)
 "Cry" (Look Sharp!, 1988)
Demo (The Rox Box/Roxette 86 - 06) (Rox Box 15)

D 
 "Dance Away" (Look Sharp!, 1988)
 "Dangerous" (Look Sharp!, 1988)
MTV Unplugged (Roxette Rarities, 1995)
single version (Don't Bore Us, Get to the Chorus - Roxette's Greatest Hits, 1995) (A collection . . ) (Rox Box 15)
swedish single version (Bag of Trix, 2020)
 "Don't Believe in Accidents" (B-Side from "Run to You", 1991)
 "(Do You Get) Excited?" (Joyride, 1991)
 T&A demo (Joyride 30th, 2021)
 "Do You Wanna Go the Whole Way?" (Crash! Boom! Bang!, 1994)
 "Dream On" (Charm School, 2011)
T&A demo 1/25/10 (Charm School revisited, 2011)
 "Dressed for Success" (Look Sharp!, 1988)
U.S. single mix (Roxette Rarities, 1995) (Don’t bore us …) (The Pop Hits, 2003) (A collection . . ) (XXX) (Rox Box 06) (Rox Box 15)

E 
 "Easy Way Out" (Travelling, 2012)
 "Entering Your Heart" (B-Side from "The Centre Of The Heart", 2001)
 "Every Day" (The Ballad Hits, 2002) (Rox Box 06) (Rox Box 15)
Studio Vinden demo (Bag of Trix, 2020)
 "Excuse Me, Sir, Do You Want Me to Check on Your Wife?" (Travelling, 2012)

F 
 "Fading Like a Flower (Every Time You Leave)" (Joyride, 1991)
 US single, Humberto Vatican mix (Joyride 30th, 2021)
 T&A demo (Joyride 30th, 2021)
 "Fingertips" (Tourism, 1992)
Fingertips ‘93 (Roxette Rarities, 1995)
 "Fireworks" (Crash! Boom! Bang!, 1994)
Jesus Jones remix (Roxette Rarities, 1995)
 "Fool" (Room Service, 2001)
 "From a Distance" (Good Karma, 2016)
 "From Head to Toe" (Look Sharp! 30th, 2022)
 "From One Heart to Another" (Pearls of Passion, 1986)
Montezuma demo (Bag of Trix, 2020)

G 
 "Go to Sleep" (Crash! Boom! Bang!, 1994)
Skinnarviksringen demo (Bag of Trix, 2020)
 "Good Karma" (Good Karma, 2016)
 "Goodbye to You" (Pearls of Passion, 1986)
Montezuma demo (Bag of Trix, 2020)

H 
 "Half a Woman, Half a Shadow" (Look Sharp!, 1988)
 "Happy on the Outside" (Charm School, 2011)
T&A demo 8/17/05 (Charm School revisited, 2011)
 "Happy Together" (B-Side from "Wish I Could Fly", 1999) (Rox Box 06) (Rox Box 15)
 "Harleys & Indians (Riders in the Sky)" (Crash! Boom! Bang!, 1994)
 "Help" (The Rox Box/Roxette 86-06, 2006) (Rox Box 15) (Trix)
 "Here Comes the Weekend" (Tourism, 1992)
 "Hotblooded" (Joyride, 1991)
T&A demo 12/13/90 (Bag of Trix, 2020) (Joyride 30th)
T&A demo 1/23/90 (Joyride 30th, 2021)
 "How Do You Do!" (Tourism, 1992)

I 
 "I Call Your Name" (Pearls of Passion, 1986)
Montezuma demo (Pearls of Passion reissue 1997)
Frank Mono-mix (Pearls of Passion reissue 1997)
 "(I Could Never) Give You Up" (Look Sharp!, 1988)
 "I Don't Want To Get Hurt" (Don't Bore Us, Get to the Chorus - Roxette's Greatest Hits, 1995) (Rox Box 06) (Rox Box 15)
 "I Love the Sound of Crashing Guitars" (Crash! Boom! Bang!, 1994)
 "I Remember You" (Joyride, 1991)
T&A demo 3/15/90 (Bag of Trix, 2020) (Joyride 30th)
T&A demo 4/1/90 (Joyride 30th, 2021)
 "I Was So Lucky" (Have a Nice Day, 1999)
Outtake (Bag of Trix, 2020)
 "I'm Glad You Called" (Charm School, 2011)
Live Demo Rotterdam 11/19/09 (Charm School revisited, 2011)
 "I'm Sorry" (Crash! Boom! Bang!, 1994)
 "In My Own Way" (Charm School, 2011)
T&A demo 8/7/09 (Charm School revisited, 2011)
 "It Hurts" (The Ballad Hits, 2002) (Rox Box 06)
T&A demo (Bag of Trix, 2020)
 "It Just Happens" (Good Karma, 2016)
 "It Must Have Been Love" (A-Side from "It Must Have Been Love"/Pretty Woman Soundtrack, 1990) (Ballad hits) (A collection . . ) (XXX) (Rox Box 06) (Rox Box 15)
 "It Must Have Been Love (Christmas for the Broken Hearted)" (A-Side from "It Must Have Been Love (Christmas for the Broken Hearted)", 1987)
 "It Takes You No Time to Get Here" (Room Service, 2001)
Outtake (Bag of Trix, 2020)
 "It Will Take a Long Long Time" (Have a Nice Day, 1999)
Modern Rock version (The Rox Box/Roxette 86-06, 2006) (Rox Box 15) (Bag of Trix, 2020)
 "It's Possible" (Travelling, 2012)
Version 2 (Travelling, 2012)

J 
 "Jefferson" (Room Service, 2001)
 "Joy of a Toy" (Pearls of Passion, 1986)
Montezuma demo (Bag of Trix, 2020)
 "Joyride" (Joyride, 1991)
MTV Unplugged (Roxette Rarities, 1995)
single edit (Don't Bore Us, Get to the Chorus - Roxette's Greatest Hits, 1995) (The Pop Hits, 2003) (A collection . . ) (XXX)
Brian Malouf U.S. single (Bag of Trix, 2020) (Joyride 30th)
Radio edit (The Rox Box/Roxette 86 - 06) (Rox Box 15)
T&A demo (Joyride 30th, 2021)
Joyrider T&A demo (Joyride 30th, 2021)
 "June Afternoon" (Don't Bore Us, Get to the Chorus - Roxette's Greatest Hits, 1995) (The Pop Hits, 2003) (XXX) (Rox Box 06) (Rox Box 15)

K 
 "Keep Me Waiting" (Tourism, 1992)
 "Knockin' on Every Door" (Joyride, 1991)
 T&A demo (Joyride 30th, 2021)

L 
 "Let Your Heart Dance with Me" (Bag of Trix, 2020) 
"Lies" (Crash! Boom! Bang!, 1994)
 "Like Lovers Do" (Pearls of Passion, 1986)
Montezuma demo (Bag of Trix, 2020)
 "Listen to Your Heart" (Look Sharp!, 1988)
Swedish single (Don't Bore Us, Get to the Chorus - Roxette's Greatest Hits, 1995) (Ballad hits) (A collection . . ) (XXX) (Rox Box 06) (Rox Box 15)
Abbey Road sessions 1995 (Bag of Trix, 2020)
 "Little Girl" (Room Service, 2001)
Studio Vinden demo (Bag of Trix, 2020)
 "Little Miss Sorrow" (The Pop Hits, 2003) (Rox Box 06) (Rox Box 15)
 "Looking for Jane" (Room Service, 2001)
 "Love Is All (Shine Your Light On Me)" (Crash! Boom! Bang!, 1994)
 "Love Spins" (The Rox Box/Roxette 86-06, 2006) (Rox Box 15) (Joyride 30th)
 "Lover, Lover, Lover" (Travelling, 2012)

M 
 "Make My Head Go Pop" (Room Service, 2001)
 "Makin' Love to You"  (The Pop Hits, 2003)
 "Me & You & Terry & Julie" (Travelling, 2012)
 "Milk and Toast and Honey" (Room Service, 2001)
 Single master (Ballad hits, 2002) (XXX)
 "My World, My Love, My Life" (Room Service, 2001)
 "Myth" (The Rox Box/Roxette 86-06, 2006) (Rox Box 15)

N 
 "Never Is a Long Time" (Tourism, 1992)
 "Neverending Love" (Pearls of Passion, 1986)
T&A demo (Pearls of Passion reissue, 1997)
Frank Mono-mix (Pearls of Passion reissue 1997)
 "New World" (The Rox Box/Roxette 86-06, 2006) (Trix)
 "No One Makes It on Her Own" (Charm School, 2011) 
T&A Demo 7/26/10 (Charm School revisited, 2011)
Alternate version is on the 2018 Per Gessle album, Small Town Talk

O 
 "One Is Such a Lonely Number" (B-Side from "The Big L.", 1991)
Demo September 1987 (Roxette Rarities, 1995)
 "One Wish" (A Collection of Roxette Hits: Their 20 Greatest Songs!, 2006) (Rox Box 15)
 "Only When I Dream" (Charm School, 2011)
T&A demo 8/7/09 (Charm School revisited, 2011)
 "Opportunity Nox" (The Pop Hits, 2003) (XXX) (Rox Box 06) (Rox Box 15)

P 
 "Paint" (Look Sharp!, 1988)
 "Pay the Price" (Have a Nice Day, 1999)
 "Pearls of Passion" (B-Side from "Soul Deep", 1987)
Montezuma demo (Bag of Trix, 2020)
 "Perfect Day" (Joyride, 1991)
T&A demo (Bag of Trix, 2020) (Joyride 30th)
 "Perfect Excuse" (Travelling, 2012) (Original version is on the Per Gessle album Party Crasher)
 "Piece of Cake" (Bag of Trix, 2020)
 "Physical Fascination" (Joyride, 1991)
 T&A demo (Joyride 30th, 2021)
 "Place Your Love" (Crash! Boom! Bang!, 1994)
”Pocketful of Rain” (Bag of Trix, 2020)

Q 
 "Queen of Rain" (Tourism, 1992)
 T&A demo (Joyride 30th, 2021)

R 
 "Real Sugar" (Room Service, 2001)
 "Reveal" (A Collection of Roxette Hits: Their 20 Greatest Songs!, 2006)
 Attic remix (Rox Box 15)
 “Run Run Run” (Joyride 30th, 2021) (Original version is on the Gyllene Tider album, The Heartland Café)
 "Run to You" (Crash! Boom! Bang!, 1994)

S 
 "Salvation" (Have a Nice Day, 1999)
 "Secrets That She Keeps" (Pearls of Passion, 1986)
T&A demo (Pearls of Passion reissue 1997)
 "Seduce Me" (B-Side from "June Afternoon", 1996) (Rox Box 06) (Rox Box 15)
 "See Me" (B-Side from "Salvation", 1999) (Rox Box 06)
 "Shadow of a Doubt" (Look Sharp!, 1988)
 "She Doesn't Live Here Anymore" (Don't Bore Us, Get to the Chorus - Roxette's Greatest Hits, 1995) (Rox Box 06) (Rox Box 15)
 "She's Got Nothing On (But the Radio)" (Charm School, 2011)
Adam Rickfors remix (Charm School revisited, 2011)
Adrian Lux remix (Charm School revisited, 2011)
T&A Demo 8/7/10 (Charm School revisited, 2011)
 "Silver Blue" (B-Side from "Chances", 1988)
 "Sitting on Top of the World" (Charm School, 2011)
T&A demo 7/13/10 (Charm School revisited, 2011)
 "Sleeping in My Car" (Crash! Boom! Bang!, 1994)
Single edit (Don't Bore Us, Get to the Chorus - Roxette's Greatest Hits, 1995) (The Pop Hits, 2003) (A collection . . ) (XXX) (Rox Box 06) (Rox Box 15)
Stockholm demo (Bag of Trix, 2020)
 "Sleeping Single" (Look Sharp!, 1988)
 "Small Talk" (Joyride, 1991)
 T&A demo (Joyride 30th, 2021)
 "So Far Away" (Pearls of Passion, 1986)
 "Some Other Summer" (Good Karma, 2016)
 "Soul Deep" (Pearls of Passion, 1986)
Tom Lord-Alge mix (Bag of Trix, 2020) (Joyride 30th)
 "Speak to Me" (Charm School, 2011)
Bassflow remake (Charm School revisited 2011) (Rox Box 15)
T&A Demo 7/13/10 (Charm School revisited, 2011)
 "Spending My Time" (Joyride, 1991)
Electric Dance remix (Roxette Rarities, 1995)
T&A demo (Joyride 30th, 2021)
 "Staring at the Ground" (Have a Nice Day, 1999)
Demo (The Rox Box/Roxette 86-06, 2006) (Rox Box 15)
 "Stars" (Have a Nice Day, 1999)
 "Stupid" (The Pop Hits, 2003) (Original version is on the Gessle album, The World According to Gessle)
 "Surrender" (Pearls of Passion, 1986)
 ”Sweet Thing” (Joyride 30th, 2021)

T 
 "The Big L." (Joyride, 1991)
T&A demo 3/29/90 (Bag of Trix, 2020) (Joyride 30th)
T&A demo 4/1/90 (Joyride 30th, 2021)
 "The Centre of the Heart (Is a Suburb to the Brain)" (Room Service, 2001)
Outtake (Bag of Trix, 2020)
 "The First Girl on the Moon" (Crash! Boom! Bang!, 1994)
 "The Heart Shaped Sea" (Tourism, 1992)
 "The Rain" (Tourism, 1992)
 "The Sweet Hello, the Sad Goodbye" (B-Side from "Spending My Time",1991) (Rarities) (Rox Box 06)
Bassflow remake (A Collection of Roxette Hits: Their 20 Greatest Songs!, 2006) (XXX) (Rox Box 15)
T&A demo (Joyride 30th, 2021)
 "The Look" (Look Sharp!, 1988)
MTV Unplugged (Roxette Rarities, 1995)
abbey road sessions 1995 (Bag of Trix, 2020)
2015 remake
 "The Voice" (B-Side from "Dressed for Success", 1988) (Rarities) (Rox Box 06) (Rox Box 15)
 "The Weight of the World" (The Ballad Hits, 2002) (Rox Box 06) (Rox Box 15)
 "Things Will Never Be the Same" (Joyride, 1991)
T&A demo 12/13/90 (Bag of Trix, 2020) (Joyride 30th)
T&A demo 6/17/89 (Joyride 30th, 2021)
T&A demo 9/17/89 (Joyride 30th, 2021)
 "This One" (Good Karma, 2016)
 "Touched by the Hand of God" (Travelling, 2012)
 "Try (Just a Little Bit Harder)" (Room Service, 2001)
 "Turn of the Tide" (Travelling, 2012)
 "Turn to Me" (B-Side from "It Must Have Been Love (Christmas for the Broken Hearted)",1987)

V 
 "View from a Hill" (Look Sharp!, 1988)
 "Voices" (Pearls of Passion, 1986)
 "Vulnerable" (Crash! Boom! Bang!, 1994)
Single version (Roxette Rarities, 1995)
single edit (Don't Bore Us, Get to the Chorus - Roxette's Greatest Hits, 1995) (Ballad hits) (Rox Box 06) (Rox Box 15)

W 
 "Waiting for the Rain" (Have a Nice Day, 1999)
Studio Vinden demo (Bag of Trix, 2020)
 "Watercolours in the Rain" (Joyride, 1991)
T&A demo (Bag of Trix, 2020) (Joyride 30th)
 "Way Out" (Charm School, 2011)
T&A Demo 1/25/10 (Charm School revisited, 2011)
 What's She Like?" (Crash! Boom! Bang!, 1994)
 "Why Don't You Bring Me Flowers?" (Good Karma, 2016)
 "Why Dontcha?" (Good Karma, 2016)
 "Wish I Could Fly" (Have a Nice Day, 1999)

Y 
 "You Can't Do This to Me Anymore" (Good Karma, 2016)
 "You Can't Put Your Arms Around What's Already Gone" (Have a Nice Day, 1999)
 "You Don't Understand Me" (Don't Bore Us, Get to the Chorus - Roxette's Greatest Hits, 1995) (Ballad hits) (XXX) (Rox Box 06) (Rox Box 15)
Abbey Road sessions 1995 (Bag of Trix, 2020)
T&A demo (Bag of Trix, 2020)
 "You Make It Sound So Simple" (Good Karma, 2016)

 
Roxette